Bhadra is a Sanskrit word meaning 'good', 'fortune' or 'auspicious'. It is also the name of many men, women and objects in Hindu mythology.

Male Figures

King of Chedi
Bhadra was a king of Chedi Kingdom who participated in the Kurukshetra War from the side of the Pandavas. He was killed by the warrior Karna.

Grandson of Manu
The first man Svayambhuva Manu and his Shatarupa had a daughter named Shraddha. Bhadra was one of her twelve sons.

Yaksha
Bhadra was also the name of a Yaksha who served their king, Kubera. Due to a curse of sage Gautama, he was born as a lion.

Krishna's son
The god Krishna married the river goddess Kalindi and had 10 sons. Bhadra was one of them.

Sage
Bhadra was a renowned Maharishi. He was the son of Pramati and the father of Upamanyu.

Female Figures

Bhadrakali

Bhadrā or Bhadrakālī is one of the fierce forms of the Supreme Goddess Devi.

Kubera's wife

Bhadrā is the queen of Yakshas. She was the daughter of an Asura named Mura and married Kubera, the god of wealth. She is also known by the names Yakshi, Chhavi, Riddhi, Manorama, Nidhi, Sahadevi  and Kuberi. Bhadrā and Kubera had three sons named Nalakuvara, Manigriva and Mayuraja, and a daughter named Minakshi.

Chandra's daughter
Bhadrā was also the name of a daughter of Chandra (alias Soma), the moon god. She once did penance to gain the sage Utathya as her husband. Seeing this, sage Atri, her grandfather, got her married to Utathya. The god of the seas, Varuna, became enamoured of her and eloped with her from Utathya's hermitage and hid her inside the sea. Despite attempts by the sage Narada to make him return Bhadrā, Varuna refused give her, causing an enraged Utathya to drink up the entire sea.
Seeing the sage's divine powers, Varuna submitted himself to his and returned Bhadrā back. The sage was pleased to get her back, and released both the world and Varuna from their sufferings.

Krishna's wife

Bhadrā is one of the Ashtabharya, the eight principal queen-consorts of Hindu god Krishna. The Vishnu Purana and the Harivamsa refer to her as 'the daughter of Dhrishtaketu' or 'the princess of Kekeya'.

Vasudeva's wife
Krishna's father Vasudeva also had a wife named Bhadrā. She died on the funeral pyre of her husband.

Wife of Vyushitashva
Bhadrā was a beautiful princess, who was the daughter of King Kakshivan. She married King Vyushitashva of Puru dynasty. After his untimely death, she lamented over his body.  The spirit of her husband appeared in the sky and blessed her with six sons.

Princess of Vishala
Bhadra was a princess of Vishala who once did penance to married King Karusha. Shishupala, a king, disguised himself as Karusha and married her.

Notes

References

Hindu goddesses
Salakapurusa